Walter von Bonhorst (1904–1978) was a German film editor. During the Nazi era he was employed at Tobis Film and UFA.

Selected filmography
 Victoria (1935)
 Maria the Maid (1936)
 Don't Promise Me Anything (1937)
 The Kreutzer Sonata (1937)
 You and I (1938)
 Renate in the Quartet (1939)
 Nanette (1940)
 Bismarck (1940)
 Two in a Big City (1942)
 The Bath in the Barn (1943)
 Journey to Happiness (1948)
 Love '47 (1949)
 My Niece Susanne (1950)
 Melody of Fate (1950)
 The Woman from Last Night (1950)
 Stips (1951)
 Rose of the Mountain (1952)
 Pension Schöller (1952)
 The Divorcée (1953)
 The Cousin from Nowhere (1953)
 Mask in Blue (1953)
 Conchita and the Engineer (1954)
 I Was an Ugly Girl (1955)
 Liane, Jungle Goddess (1956)
 The Big Chance (1957)
 Paradise for Sailors (1959)
 The Avenger (1960)
 Willy the Private Detective (1960)
 We Cellar Children (1960)
 What Is the Matter with Willi? (1970)
 Under the Roofs of St. Pauli (1970)

References

Bibliography 
 Giesen, Rolf.  Nazi Propaganda Films: A History and Filmography. McFarland, 2003.

External links 
 

1904 births
1978 deaths
Film people from Frankfurt
German film editors